Thomas Fabbiano and Gabriel Trujillo-Soler were the defending champions but decided not to participate.

Alessio di Mauro and Alessandro Motti won the title, defeating Daniele Giorgini and Stefano Travaglia 7–6(7–5), 4–6, [10–7] in the final.

Seeds

  Alessio di Mauro /  Alessandro Motti (champions)
  Nikolaus Moser /  Max Raditschnigg (semifinals)
  Alessandro Giannessi /  Matteo Viola (quarterfinals)
  Steven Diez /  Pere Riba (quarterfinals, withdrew)

Draw

Draw

References
 Main Draw

Carisap Tennis Cup - Doubles
ATP Challenger San Benedetto